Plouguin is a commune in the Finistère department of Brittany in north-western France.

Population
Inhabitants of Plouguin are called in French Plouguinois.

Saint Winwaloe
Plouguin is considered to have been (about 460) the birthplace of Saint Winwaloe, and his supposed place of birth, a feudal hillock, is still pointed out.

International relations
Plouguin is twinned with the town of Newport in Pembrokeshire, Wales.

See also
Communes of the Finistère department

References

External links

Official website 

Mayors of Finistère Association 

Communes of Finistère